This is a list of ferns and other pteridophytes native to the U.S state of Georgia.

References 

Lists of plants
Flora of Georgia (U.S. state)